Muhammad Zuasyraf bin Zulkiefle (born 27 April 1996) is a Malaysian professional footballer who plays as a midfielder for Malaysia Super League club Terengganu.

Early life
He was born in Kampung Gong Tok Nasek, Kuala Terengganu. Zuasyraf received his early educations from Sekolah Kebangsaan Seri Budiman and Sekolah Menengah Panji Alam Kuala Terengganu.

Club career
Zuasyraf started his professional career playing for Terengganu II having promoted to the first team in 2021. Early in the 2023 season, he was criticized for his performance.

Career statistics

Club

Honours

Terengganu
 Malaysia Super League runner-up: 2022

References

External links
 

1996 births
Living people
Malaysian footballers
People from Terengganu
Terengganu FC players
Malaysia Super League players
Malaysian people of Malay descent
Association football midfielders